Frank Oh Hock Chu (born 26 August 1946) is a Singaporean former sports shooter. He competed in the mixed trap event at the 1976 Summer Olympics.

References

External links
 

1946 births
Living people
Singaporean male sport shooters
Olympic shooters of Singapore
Shooters at the 1976 Summer Olympics
Place of birth missing (living people)
Shooters at the 1974 Asian Games
Shooters at the 1978 Asian Games
Asian Games competitors for Singapore
20th-century Singaporean people